John Flannagan  may refer to:

 John Flannagan (Medal of Honor) (born 1852), American sailor and Medal of Honor recipient
 John Flannagan (priest) (1860–1926), Catholic priest and president of St. Ambrose College
 John Bernard Flannagan (1895–1942) American sculptor
 John W. Flannagan, Jr. (1885–1955), American politician

See also 
 John Flanagan (disambiguation)